David M. Oshinsky (born 1944) is an American historian. He is the director of the Division of Medical Humanities at NYU School of Medicine and a professor in the Department of History at New York University.

Background
Oshinsky graduated from  Cornell in 1965 and obtained his PhD from Brandeis University in 1971. He won the annual Pulitzer Prize in History for his 2005 book, Polio: An American Story. Oshinsky’s most recent book, Bellevue: Three Centuries of Medicine and Mayhem at America’s Most Storied Hospital, was published in 2016. His other books include the D.B. Hardeman Prize-winning A Conspiracy So Immense: The World of Joe McCarthy, and the Robert Kennedy Prize-winning "Worse Than Slavery": Parchman Farm and the Ordeal of Jim Crow Justice. His articles and reviews appear regularly in The New York Times, The Washington Post, and The Chronicle of Higher Education. He previously held the Jack S. Blanton chair in history at the University of Texas at Austin.

Bibliography

Books

Selected articles

See also
Jim Crow laws

References

External links
 David M. Oshinsky, Professor Emeritus, UT–Austin
 
 

1944 births
21st-century American historians
21st-century American male writers
Pulitzer Prize for History winners
Cornell University alumni
Brandeis University alumni
University of Texas at Austin faculty
Jewish American historians
Date of birth missing (living people)
Place of birth missing (living people)
Living people
American male non-fiction writers